Soda PDF is a family of applications used to open, view, create, convert, edit, secure and share Portable Document Format (PDF) files. The software was developed by LULU Software, based in Montreal, Quebec, Canada.

History 
In 2010, shortly after the foundation of LULU Software, the first version of Soda PDF was launched as LULU Software’s flagship product line.  Soda PDF was created and originated at LULU Software’s headquarters in Montreal, Quebec, Canada.

In December 2011, LULU Software announced that they would be launching a new Soda PDF product line featuring 3D viewing technology, new customizable viewing options, and enhanced editing capabilities. CNET reviewed Soda PDF Professional 2011 as being “capable, flexible, easy to use, and affordable enough for individuals and organizations that need more than what free tools offer yet can't afford the big-box bundles.”

In 2012, a new version called Soda 3D PDF Reader 2012 was released. This version was complimented for its “realistic” page-turning feature. The full featured Soda PDF 2012 was the next release, and its Pro version was rated as being impressive due to its “straightforward design,” with its navigation system enabling “accessing tools easier and more efficient.” It was also said to have “no trouble creating good-looking PDFs from source files saved in other file formats.” This simple and easy-to-use interface was carried over to future designs of the Soda PDF software.

Soda PDF 12 
Soda PDF 12 was released on August 5, 2020, and included significant changes to the speed and functionality of the software. The upgrade includes the following features:

 New user interface
The major update regarding Soda PDF 12 was their newly revamped user interface in which the software completely revamped their user experience within the updated application.

 Increased speed
Part of Soda PDF 12’s improvements also included improving upon the speed of their PDF conversion tools. Soda PDF now has the fastest PDF to Microsoft Office converter on the market in which users can now quickly convert their PDF document to export the file as Word, Excel, PowerPoint document or even as an image file.

 New page feature
The release of Soda PDF 12 included a new feature tab called Page allowing users to view the layout of their document’s pages. Using the Page feature, users can select from a variety of tools to rotate, replace, move, or reverse the order of pages within any document. Page feature also includes tools for cropping, resizing, or modifying the margins of pages.

Furthermore, the new Page feature also included tools for extracting images from pages and an insert pages tool. Users also have the option of extracting a page, or a range of pages, to then create brand new PDF documents from those extractions.

 E-Sign
Soda PDF 12 also introduced a new E-Sign experience for its users. The new "Sign your document" and "Request Signature" tools were introduced which enables users to choose between adding their own e-signature to a PDF document, or to include, request, and track electronic signatures from other signers, respectively.

Features 
Tech Republic remarked that one of the best functions of Soda PDF was how easy it was to change the file size of the PDFs when saving. While reviewing Soda PDF 5, they commented on the fact that reducing file sizes was a straightforward process with the optimize feature. The file size can be adjusted using a slider ranging from minimum to maximum quality. The output can be further tuned by tweaking image sampling based on whether images contain color, grayscale or monochrome elements. Tech Republic concluded that Soda PDF did an excellent job of balancing readability and crunching bits down to more manageable sizes. This feature was carried forward to Soda PDF version 6 as well.

Other Soda PDF 6 features are based on older versions such as Soda PDF 2012 and Soda PDF 5. The software also has the ability to read comic book files such as CBR and CBZ, and eBook files such as EPUB.

In a 2016 review of Soda PDF 8 PC Mag highlighted the "powerful PDF creation and editing tools" and Soda PDF's integration with cloud storage, but considered the modular pricing model a drawback and called the OCR "spotty".

Soda View / 3D and Create 
Soda View/3D is a free PDF application users can use to open, view, and create PDF files. The flipping animation tool of its patent-pending 3D feature enables users to go through pages of PDF files as they would in real life. CNET has praised the 3D Reader as being “clean and inviting,” as well as “fast and easy to use.” However, the program also installs unwanted software that creates frequent pop-ups in Windows.

Version history

References

External links 
Official website

Canadian companies established in 2010
PDF software
Software companies established in 2010